Robert F. Guichard was a clerk of the Louisiana House of Representatives, a state legislator, and a public official in Louisiana. He was a Republican.

He represented St. Bernard Parish in the Louisiana House of Representatives from 1872 to 1874 and in the Louisiana Senate from 1884 to 1892.

He signed an appeal to Governor William Pitt Kellogg in 1875.

Guichard served as a parish superintendent of education.

Leopold Guichard was a representative of Saint Bernard Parish at the 1868 Louisiana Constitutional Convention.

References

Republican Party members of the Louisiana House of Representatives
Republican Party Louisiana state senators
People from St. Bernard Parish, Louisiana
19th-century American politicians
Year of birth missing
Year of death missing
School board members in Louisiana